The Kam-Craft Kamvair-2 is an American aircraft designed for homebuilt construction.

Design and development
The Kamvair-2 is a two- or four-place, strut-braced, high-wing amphibious aircraft, powered by a single engine mounted over the wings. The fuselage is of all-wood construction.

Specifications (Kamvair-2)

See also

References

Homebuilt aircraft